Student rights are those rights, such as civil, constitutional, contractual and consumer rights, which regulate student rights and freedoms and allow students to make use of their educational investment. These include such things as the right to free speech and association, to due process, equality, autonomy, safety and privacy, and accountability in contracts and advertising, which regulate the treatment of students by teachers and administrators. There is very little scholarship about student rights throughout the world. In general most countries have some kind of student rights (or rights that apply in the educational setting) enshrined in their laws and proceduralized by their court precedents. Some countries, like Romania, in the European Union, have comprehensive student bills of rights, which outline both rights and how they are to be proceduralized. Most countries, however, like the United States and Canada, do not have a cohesive bill of rights and students must use the courts to determine how rights precedents in one area apply in their own jurisdictions.

Canada
Canada, like the United States, has a number of laws and court precedents which regulate higher education and provide student rights. The Canadian Encyclopedia, which details issues of Canadian life and governance, states that in Canada "Basically two sorts of rights apply to students: substantive rights – the actual rights that students should enjoy – and procedural rights – methods by which students claim their rights. This article is concerned with students in public institutions, although those in private schools can claim rights under the common law and provincial education Acts."

Canada does not yet have a national student Bill of Rights or comparable document. If and when one is put in place in Canada it is likely that this document will be called a Charter of Student Rights and Freedoms. The Canadian Charter of Rights and Freedoms is equivalent to the National Bill of Rights in the United States. The Canadian national student union or government is the Canadian Federation of Students and it has not put forth any such bill.

France

Privacy rights

 Right to privacy in higher education
In the AlBaho Case, a French criminal court found three senior academics at the École Supérieure de Physique et de Chimie Industrielles de la Ville de Paris (ICPSE) guilty of email espionage. This was the first incident where academic staff were found guilty of a criminal act as a result of a complaint made by a student – and where those staff members had the full support of their institution.

United States

European Union

Romania
Romania is the country with the greatest student rights legislation currently in place. In 2011 the National Alliance of Student Organizations in Romania, which is also part of the European Student Union, worked with the Romanian National Government to bring into law the Romanian National Student Code of Rights and Responsibilities. This document provides Romanian students with roughly a hundred theoretical and procedural rights necessary to ensure theoretical rights are fulfilled. This document includes the following rights:

Educational package rights
 Right to a quality education
 Right to a student centered educational environment
 Right to opportunities to develop personally
 Right to opportunities to develop socially
 Right to opportunities to acquire skills required to find and retain employment
 Right to an educational contract
 Right to equal treatment among equal students
 Right to equity where some students are at an educational disadvantage
 Right to information transparency and accessibility
 Right to educational quality standards which are assessed and accountable
 Right to student involvement in institutional decision-making
 Right to at least one free copy of the student record including diplomas, certificates and transcripts
 Right to information on all student rights and responsibilities
 Right to grievance reporting, hearing and appeals processes
 Right to be provided educational materials while attending institutions of higher education
 Right to housing accommodations, unless a student studies in their place of residence
 Right to transportation while attending institutions of higher education
 Right to meals while attending institutions of higher education
 Right to medical coverage while attending institutions of higher education
 Right to postpone and resume studies
 Right to transfer from one university to another
 Right to the protection of student information
 Right to an eight-hour school day

Contract rights
 Right to a continuous contract during a period of enrollment, without a change in degree requirements
 Right to retain property and copyright for results of research, artistic creation and innovation unless contracts exist
 Right to participate in programs and services in accordance with advertised program objectives
 Right to be evaluated in accordance with advertised curriculum evaluation criteria
 Right to be evaluated with criteria in line with advertised course objectives

Equitability rights
 Right to equitable recruitment, admissions, readmissions, testing, education, instruction and assessment
 Right to access social mobility programs and resources
 Right to subsidized tuition for students from historically marginalized and low socio-economic backgrounds
 Right to free educational and professional guidance, counseling, tutoring and monitoring for subsidized students
 Right to the availability of academic, professional psychological and social counseling with educational objectives
 Right to study in one's native language or a language of international communication if offered
 Right to exam accommodations for certified temporary and permanent medical conditions
 Right to have registration periods of at least on working week after the posting of scholarships or programs
 Right to flexible learning paths and a minimum number of optional courses
 Right to be provided free medical assistance
 Right to a 50% + discount on public transportation
 Right to a 75% discount for access to events organized by public institutions
 Right to subsidies for housing accommodations for low income or historically marginalized backgrounds

Accountability and quality assurance rights
 Right to a quality education (with quality standards in place)
 Right to quality standards for teachers and course resources for use in quality assurance and evaluation
 Right to quality standards for support resources for use in quality assurance and evaluation
 Right to the availability of information related to stated educational objectives
 Right to participate in evaluation of teachers, courses, seminars, programs, practicums, internships, residencies
 Right to access teacher, course, seminar, program, practicum, internship, residency evaluations as public info
 Right to have evaluations used for assessment of quality and objective achievement
 Right to know how tuition, fees and other charges are determined or justified
 Right to be informed about the number, type and amount of each fee charged
 Right to institutional consultation with student organizations on issues in higher education
 Right to representative participation in university executive and deliberative bodies
 Right to 25%+ representative participation in the university senate and faculty council
 Right to representative participation in faculty counsels and university senates or governance structures
 Right to representative participation in management of social services, accommodations and scholarships
 Right to representatives participation in government departments involving students
 Right to representative participation in choosing and appointing an institutional president or head
 Right to student representative elections free of interference from instructors and administrators
 Right to serve as a student representative for up to four years regardless of academic performance or attendance
 Right to be informed and consulted by student representatives on matters in institutional governance
 Right for student organizations to develop an annual report on institutional compliance with this code
 Right to an annual response to the compliance report including proposed improvements and a timeline

Due process rights
 Right to submit grievances and expect recourse for identity theft
 Right to submit grievances and expect recourse for abuse of power
 Right to submit grievances and expect recourse for arbitrary and capricious decision making
 Right to appeal grades before a committee. The instructor who issued the grade may not sit on this committee.
 Right to request a review of complaints by specialized bodies
 Right to be present during appeal hearings
 Right to protection from retribution when making a complaint (whistle blower protections)
 Right to have all written or online requests registered
 Right to have all written and online requests answered

Information accessibility rights
 Right to freely access all educational materials available in university libraries or institutional websites
 Right to receive, upon admissions, a Student Guide containing information on:
 student rights and responsibilities
 materials and services provided by the university
 evaluation methods
 justification and methods used to establish fees
 university and faculty facilities
 details about student organizations
 ways of accessing scholarships and other financial facilities
 Right to receive a five-page syllabus within the first two weeks of the semester containing:
 course objectives
 general competences or outcomes students will achieve
 curriculum
 course timeline of readings and assignments
 evaluation and examination methods
 Right to adherence to the syllabus unless the teacher has the students' agreement
 Right to receive the syllabus in either an electronic format or a physical copy
 Right to information on the scale used for evaluation of skills
 Right to institutional policies which inform students of their rights
 Right to access regulations, decisions, meeting minutes and any other legal documents at the institution
 Right to receive a copy of their diploma, thesis, score and details about the score
 Right to information on criteria and methods used to identify and evaluate processional practice
 Right to information on criteria used to evaluate the quality of academic classes and programs

The student rights movement
Students in both Europe and North America began calling for the expansion of civil rights and student rights during the Vietnam War era. They established legal rights by forming student unions and lobbying for institutional policies (thus, changing the cultural treatment of students), lobbying for legislative change on state and national levels and circulating petitions for the creation of national student rights bills. In America, for instance, students won the right to retain their civil rights in institutions of higher education. In Europe, this movement has been explosive. Students have banded together and formed unions in individual institutions, at the state and national levels and eventually at the continental level as the European Student Union. They have been instrumental in lobbying for rights in individual countries and in the EU in general. In 2011, for instance, Romania put forth an extensive national student bill of rights providing Romanian students with a hundred rights assembled in a clear and easy to access document. Europe has also set forth legislation stipulating the rights of EU students studying in other EU countries.

European students have used the tactics established during the global labour movement of the eighteen and nineteen hundreds to gain labour or work place standards. They have unionized, stated their demands both verbally and in writing (sometimes in the form of a proposed student bill of rights), publicized their message and gone on strike. During the labor movement, workers in the United States, for example, won the right to a 40-hour work week, to a minimum wage, to equal pay for equal work, to be paid on time, to contract rights, for safety standards, a complaint filing process etc. Students have, likewise, demanded that these regulations as well as civil, constitutional, contract and consumer rights, which regulate other industries, be applied to higher education.

The European student movement and the United States movement differ in a number of ways. These differences may be a factor in determining why European Students have been more successful in obtaining legally recognized student rights, from the right to access free education to the right to move and study freely from one EU country to the next, to the right to exercise their national legal rights in institutions of higher education.

Differences between European and United States student movements
 National student organization mandates: Different levels of student representation
The European Student Union ESU mandate requires the ESU to determine the demands of students and to convey them to legislators. The United States Student Association USSA also has a mandate to amplify the student voice in legal decision making but it does not stipulate how it will determine the student voice or ensure that it is representative of the students themselves. The ESU focuses on gathering input from students across the nation, creates a student bill of rights enabling students to critique it, proposes legislation to achieve these rights at both the state and continental level and then creates information resources so students know their rights. The USSA, determines its objectives through the USSA membership. USSA does not seem to conduct research across the nation or to state student objectives on their website so students can express a desire to add or delete from this list. If the USSA does conduct research they do not show this on their website, do not have a search function on the website and do not publish this information for students.
 Currently, the ESU mandate is to "promote the educational, social, economic and cultural interests of students", to "represent, defend and strengthen students’ educational, democratic and political and social rights and "represent and promote the[m] ... at the European [continental] level towards all relevant bodies and in particular the European Union, Bologna Follow Up Group, Council of Europe and UNESCO." The ESU will accomplish this by "conducting research", "campaigns", "conferences", "trainings", "partnership projects", "providing information", and creating "publications" for "students, policy-makers and higher education professionals."
 The ASSU's mandate is to "develop[] current and future leaders and amplif[y] the student voice at the local, state, and national levels by mobilizing grassroots power to win concrete victories on student issues. The United States Student Association Foundation ensures the pipeline of effective student leadership by facilitating education, training and other development opportunities at national, state, and local levels in advocating for issues that affect students." The mission statement does not say how they intend to do these things but it seems from the website that they hold grass roots lobbying, student conferences and electoral training, and propose bills to the US Senate.
 National student organization mandates: Publicity for student demands
The ESU clearly states student demands through the nation and through the EU. They have compiled these demands into a student bill of rights, referred to as the 2008 Student Rights Charter. This document is not legally binding but it is a clear representation of all student demands. It helps students, institutions and governments understand what students are demanding and also helps student unions, in individual institutions, lobby for rights which help change the culture and treatment of students on a local level. The ESU has democratically created a proposed student bill of rights they want accepted in legislation at a national and continental level. These demands include: access to higher education, to student involvement in institutional governance, extracurricular support and curricular quality standards. Each right has been broken down into more detailed demands required to achieve these rights. While student associations in America are pushing for this, there has been no centralized effort through the national student association.

USSA Legislative initiatives have included student debt forgiveness, enabling undocumented immigrant students to attend college, allocating more governmental money toward institutions and students but again these objectives seem to be created by USSA members without national research on the student voice. There is no way to search their website to determine if they conduct research to gather input form students across the nation.
 Institutional student bodies: A student union focus vs. a student government focus.

The European student movement and the United States movement also differ on a local institutional level. In Europe most institutional student organizations are referred to as student unions which suggests that they are engaged in lobbying for student rights. In America these are referred to as Student Governments or Student Associations and the focus is more on learning the democratic process. The problem is, however, that most student governments only have about 20-25% representation in the Academic Senate or institutional decision making body and far less experience in democratic processes than other institutional representatives. Student governments focus on teaching students how to be leaders and participate in democracy where as unions focus more on determining the student voice and achieving student rights through lobbying.

See also 
 European Students' Union
 Student bill of rights
 Youth rights
 Student voice
 Student Press Law Center
 National Youth Rights Association
 Leonard Law
 Student activism
 Students' union
 The Freechild Project
 Youth
 Youth suffrage
 Youth rights
 Age of candidacy

References

Citation list
 Age Discrimination Act of 1975, 42 U.S.C. § 6101-6107 et seq. (US Code, 2006) / Age
 Discrimination Act of 1975, Pub. L. No. 94-135 §, 89 Stat. 713 (US Code, 2006)
 Age Discrimination in Employment Act of 1967 (ADEA), 29 U.S.C. § 621-634 et seq. (US Code, 2009) / Age Discrimination in Employment
 Act of 1967 (ADEA), Pub. L. No. 90-202 §, 81 Stat. 202 (US Code, 2006)
 Americans with Disabilities Act of 1990 (ADA), 42 U.S.C.A. § 12101 et seq. (US Code, 2009) / Americans with Disabilities Act of 1990, Pub. L. No. 101-336 §, 104 Stat. 327 (US Code, 2006)
 Andre v. Pace University, 655 NYS 2d 777 (App. Div. 2nd Dept. 1996)
 Bach, J. J. (2003). Students have rights too: The drafting of student conduct codes. Brigham Young University Education & Law Journal, (1), 1. Retrieved from EBSCOhost.
 Bowe v. SMC Elec. Prods., 945 F. Supp. 1482, 1485 (D. Colo. 1996) LEXIS- NEXIShost.http://www.lexisnexis.com/hottopics/lnacademic/
 Bowden, R. (2007). Evolution of responsibility: From "in loco parentis" to "ad meliora vertamur". Education, 127(4), 480-489. Retrieved from EBSCOhost. Bradshaw v. Rawlings, 612 F. 2d 135 (3rd Cir. 1979)
 Brown v. Board of Education, 347 US 74 (1954)
 Civil Rights Act of 1964, 42 U.S.C. § 2000e et seq. (US Code, 2006) / Civil Rights Act of 1964, Pub. L. No. 88-352 §, 78 Stat. 241 (US Code, 2006)
 Civil Rights Act Amendments of 1991 (CRAA), 42 U.S.C.A. § 1981 et seq. (US Code, 2006) / Civil Rights Act Amendments of 1991 (CRAA), Pub. L. No. 88-352 §, 78 Stat. 241 (US Code, 2006)
 Christman, D. E. (2002). Change and continuity: A historical perspective of campus search and seizure issues. Brigham Young University Education & Law Journal, (1), 141. Retrieved from EBSCOhost.
 Clery Crime Awareness and Campus Security Act of 2008, 20 U.S.C. § 1092 et seq. (US Code, 2009) / Clery Crime Awareness and Campus Security Act of 2008, Pub. L. No. 110-315 §, 122 Stat. 3078 (US Code, 2006) / Clery Act of 1990, 20 U.S.C. § 1092 et seq. (US Code, 2006) / Clery Act of 1990, Pub. L. No. 101-542 §, 104 Stat. 2384 (US Code, 2006)
 Cooper, D., Saunders, S., Winston, R., Hirt, J. Creamer, D. Janosik, S. (2002) Learning through supervised practice in student affairs New York: Routledge.
 
 Department of Education, Office of Civil Rights (1997). Sexual harassment guidance: Harassment of students by school employees, other students or third parties. Washington DC: U.S. Dept. of Education, Office of Educational Research and Improvement, Educational Resources Information Center, Office of Civil Rights http://www2.ed.gov/about/offices/list/ocr/docs/sexhar01.html
 Dezick v. Umpqua Community College 599 P. 2d 444 (OR 1979)
 Equal Educational Opportunity Act of 1974, 20 U.S.C. § 1701 et seq. (US Code, 2006) / Equal Educational Opportunity Act of 1974, Pub. L. No. 93-380 §, 89 Stat. 713 (US Code, 2006) Equal Pay Act of 1963, 29 U.S.C. § 206 et seq. (US Code, 2006) / Equal Pay Act of 1963, Pub. L. No. 88-38 §, 77 Stat. 56 (US Code, 2006)
 Gibbs, A. (1992). Reconciling rights and responsibilities of colleges and students: Offensive speech, assembly, drug testing and safety. ERIC Digest. Retrieved from EBSCOhost.
 Family Educational Rights and Privacy Act of 1974, 20 U.S.C. § 1232 et seq. (US Code, 2006) / Family Educational Rights and Privacy Act of 1974, Pub. L. No. 93-380 §, 88 Stat. 484 (US code 2009)
 Gearan, J. S. (2006). When is it ok to tattle? - The need to amend the family educational rights and privacy act. Suffolk University Law Review, (39) 1023, 1024-1046. Retrieved from LEXIS-NEXIShost
 Gregory, D. E. (2008) Review of ‘the law of higher education’. NASPA Journal (45)1, 162-67
 Grutter v. Bollinger, 539 US 306 (2003)
 Hendrickson, R. M., Gibbs, A., ASHE & ERIC (1986). The college, the constitution, and the consumer student: Implications for policy and practice. ASHE-ERIC Higher Education Report No. 7, 1986. Retrieved from EBSCOhost. http://www.ericdigests.org/pre-926/consumer.htm
 Higher Education Opportunity Act of 1965 20 U.S.C. § 1001 et seq. (US Code, 2006) / Higher Education Opportunity Act of 1965, Pub. L. No. 89-329 §, 70 Stat. 1219 (US Code, 2006)
 Higher Educational Act Amendments of 1972, 20 U.S.C. § 1981 et seq. (US Code, 2006) / Higher Educational Act Amendments of 1972, Pub. L. No. 92-318 §, 86 Stat. 373 (US Code, 2006)
 Higher Education Opportunity Act of 2008 20 U.S.C. § 1001 et seq. (US Code, 2006) / Higher Education Opportunity Act of 2008, Pub. L. No. 110-315 §, 110 Stat. 3078 (US Code, 2006)
 Hill v. University of Kentucky, Wilson, and Schwartz, 978 F. 2d 1258 (ED Kentucky 1992)
 Hillis v. Stephen F. Austin University, 665 F. 2d 547 (5th Cir.1982)
 Hupart v. Bd. of Higher Ed. of the City of New York, 420 F. Supp. 1087 (SD NY 1976)
 Illegal Immigration Reform and Immigrant Responsibility Act of 1996 20 U.S.C. § 1001 et seq. (US Code, 2006) / Illegal Immigration Reform and Immigrant Responsibility Act of 1996, Pub. L. No. 104-208 §, 110 Stat. 1219 (US Code, 2006)
 Immigration and Reform Control Act of 1986 (IRCA) of 8 U.S.C. § 1101 et seq. (US Code, 2006) / Immigration and Reform Control Act of 1986 (IRCA), Pub. L. No. 99-603 §, 100 Stat. 3359 (US Code, 2006)
 Kaye, T., Bickel, R., & Birtwistle, T. (2006). Criticizing the image of the student as consumer: examining legal trends and administrative responses in the US and UK. Education & the Law, 18(2/3), 85-129. 
 Keen v. Penson, 970 F. 2d 252 (7th Cir. 1992)
 Lewis, L. S. (2005). Litigating grades: A cautionary tale. Academic Questions, 19(1), 48-58. Retrieved from EBSCOhost.
 Mawdsley, R. D. (2004). Student rights, safety, and codes of conduct. New Directions for Community Colleges, (125), 5-15. Retrieved from EBSCOhost.
 Meadow, R. (1999), Clear and convincing evidence: How much is enough? California Insurance Law and Regulation Reporter 5, 116-121.
 National Association of Student Personnel Administrators, I. c. (1993). Student Rights and Freedoms. Joint Statement on Rights and Freedoms of Students. Retrieved from EBSCOhost.
 Office for Civil Rights (DHEW), W. C. (DHEW), Washington, DC. (1972). Higher Education Guidelines for Executive Order 11246. Retrieved from EBSCOhost.
 Parkes, J., & Harris, M. B. (2002). The purposes of a syllabus. College Teaching, 50(2), 1. Retrieved from EBSCOhost
 Poskanzer, S. G. (2002) Higher education law the faculty. Baltimore, Md.: Johns Hopkins University Press.
 Pregnancy Discrimination Act of 1978, 42 U.S.C. § 2000e et seq. (US Code, 2006) / Pregnancy Discrimination Act of 1978, Pub. L. No. 95-555 §, 92 Stat. 2076 (US Code, 2006)
 Rehabilitation Act Section 504 of 1973, 29 U.S.C. § 794 et seq. (US Code, 2006) / Rehabilitation Act 1973, Pub. L. No. 93-112 §, 87 Stat. 394 (US Code, 2006)
 Rafferty, D. P. (1993). Technical foul! Ross v. creighton university allows courts to penalize universities which do not perform specific promises made to student-athletes. South Dakota Law Review (38) 173. Retrieved from LEXIS-NEXIShost. http://www.lexisnexis.com/hottopics/lnacademic/
 Sarabyn, K. (2008). The twenty-sixth amendment: Resolving the federal circuit split over college students' first amendment rights. Texas Journal on Civil Liberties & Civil Rights, 14(1), 27-93. Retrieved from EBSCOhost.
 Thomas, N. L. (1991). The new in loco parentis. Change, 23(5), 32. Retrieved from EBSCOhost.
 Vile, J.R. (2010). Encyclopedia of constitutional amendments, proposed amendments, and amending issues, 1789-2011. California: ABC-CLIO.
 White, B. (2007). Student rights: From in loco parentis to sine parentibus and back again? Understanding the family educational rights and privacy act in higher education. Brigham Young University Education & Law Journal, (2), 321-350. Retrieved from EBSCOhost.
 93 Special Message to the Congress on Protecting the Consumer Interest. March 15, 1962. (2001). American Reference Library - Primary Source Documents, 1. Retrieved from EBSCOhost
 Aboode v. Detroit Board of Education, 431 US 209 (1977)
 Adarand Constructors, Inc., v. Pena, 515 US 200 (1995)
 Ahmed v. University of Toledo, 822 F.2d 26 (6th Cir. 1987)
 Albert Merrill School v. Godoy, 357 NYS 2d 378 (NY City Civil Ct. 1974)
 American Civil Liberties Union of Georgia v. Miller, 977 F. Supp. 1228 (ND Ga. 1997)
 Anderson v. Mass. Inst of Tech, 1995 WL 813188, 1, 4 (Mass. Super, 1995)
 Anderson v. University of Wisconsin, 841 F. 2d 737 (7th Cir. 1988)
 Anthony v. Syracuse, 231 NYS 435 (NY App. Div. 1928)
 Antonelli v. Hammond, 308 F. Supp. 1329 (Dist. Mass. 1970)
 Axson-Flynn v. Johnson, 365 F. 3d 1277 (10th Cir. 2004)
 Bakke v. Regents of the University of California, 438 US 265 (1978)
 Barker v. Hardway, 399 F. 2d 368 (4th Cir. 1968)
 Bayless v. Maritime, 430 F. 2d 873, 877 (5th Cir. 1970)
 Beukas v. Fairleigh, 605 A. 2d 708 (NJ App. Div. 1992)
 Board of Curators of the University of Missouri v. Horowitz 435 US 78 (1978)
 Bonnell v. Lorenzo, 241 F. 3d 800 (6th Cir. 2001)
 Bowe v. SMC Elec. Prods., 945 F. Supp. 1482, 1485 (D. Colo. 1996)
 Brody v. Finch Univ. of Health Sci. / Chicago Med. Sch., 698 NE 2d 257, 298 (IL App. Ct. 1998)
 Bruner v. Petersen, 944 P. 2d 43 (AK Sup. Ct. 1997)
 Bynes v. Toll, 512 F. 2d 252 (2nd Cir. 1975)
 Camara v. Municipal Court of city and country of San Francisco, 387 US 523 (1967)
 Carlin v. Trustees of Boston University, 907 F. Supp. 509 (D. Mass. 1995)
 Carr v. St. Johns University, 231 NYS 2d 410, 231 (NY App. Div. 1962)
 Central Hudson Gas and Electric Corp. v. Public Service Commission, 447 US 557 (1980)
 Cf. Meritor Savings Bank v. Vinson, 477 US 57 (1986)
 Chess v. Widmar, 635 F. 2d 1310 (8th Cir. 1980)
 Church of the Lukumi Babalu Aye v. City of Hileah, 508 US 520 (1993)
 City of Richmond v. J. A. Croson Co., 488 US 469 (1989)
 Civil Rights Office Tanberg v. Weld County Sheriff, 787 F. Supp. 970 (D. Co. 1992)
 Clark v. Holmes, 474 F. 2d 928 (7th Cir. 1972)
 Clayton v. Trustees of Princeton University, 608 F. Supp. 413 (D. NJ 1985)
 Cohen v. San Bernardino Valley College, 92 F. 3d 968 (9th Cir. 1996)
 Cooper v. Nix, 496 F. 2d 1285 (5th Cir. 1974)
 Cooper v. Ross, 472 F. Supp. 802 (ED Ark. 1979)
 Crook v. Baker, 813 F. 2d 88 (6th Cir. 1987)
 Dambrot v. Central Michigan University, 839 F. Supp. 477 (ED MI 1993)
 Dambrot v. Central Michigan University, 55 F. 3d 1177 (6th Cir. 1995)
 Davis v. Monroe County Board of Education, 526 US 629 (1999)
 DeFunis v. Odegaard, 416 US 312 (1974)
 DeRonde v. Regents of the Univ. of California, 625 P. 2d 220 (CA Sup. 1981)
 Devers v. Southern University, 712 So. 2d (LA App. 1998)
 Dixon v. Alabama, 294 F. 150 (5th Cir. 1961)
 Doe v. Kamehameha Schools, 416 F. 3d 1025 (9th Cir. 2005)
 Doherty v. Southern College of Optometry, 862 F. 2d 570 (6th Cir. 1988)
 Donohue v. Baker, 976 F. Supp. 136 (ND NY 1997)
 Durate v. Commonwealth, 407 SE 2d 41, 12 (VA App. 1991)
 Eden v. Board of Trustees of State University, 374 NYS 2d 686 (NY App. 1975)
 Edwards v. California Univ. of Pa., 156 F. 3d 488 (3rd Cir. 1998)
 Eiseman v. State of New York, 518 NYS 2d 608 (NY App. 1987)
 Erzinger v. Regents of the University of California, 137 Cal. App. 3d 389, 187 (CA App. 1982)
 Esteban v. Central Missouri State College, 277 F. Supp. 649 (WD MI 1967)
 Faulkner v. Jones, 51 F. 3d 440 (4th Cir. 1995)
 Fellheimer v. Middleburry College, 869 F. Supp. 238 (D. VA 1994)
 Fleming v. New York University, 865 F. 2d 478 (2nd Cir. 1989)
 Florida ex rel. Hawkins v. Board of Control, 350 US 413 (1956)
 Franklin v. Gwinnett County Public Schools, 503 US 60 (1992)
 French v. Bashful, 303 F. Supp. 1333 (ED LA 1969)
 Furek v. University of Delaware, 594 A. 2d 506 (DE Supp. 1991)
 Gabrilowitz v. Newman, 582 F. 2d 100 (1st Cir. 1978)
 Garcia v. S.U.N.Y. Health Sciences Center of Brooklyn, 280 F. 3d 98 (2nd Cir. 2001)
 Gay Activists Alliance v. Bd. of Regents of Univ. of Oklahoma, 638 P. 2d 1116 (OK Sup. 1981)
 Gay Students Org. of the University of New Hampshire v. Bonner, 509 F. 2d 652 (1st Cir. 1974)
 Gay Student Services v. Texas A&M University, 737 F. 2d 1317 (5th Cir. 1984)
 Gebser v. Lago Vista Independent School District, 524 US 274 (1998)
 Goldberg v. Kelly, 397 US 254 (1970)
 Good v. Associated Students, Univ. of Washington, 542 P. 2d 762 (WA Sup. 1975)
 Goodman v. President and Trustees of Bowdoin College, 135 F. Supp. 2d 40 (D. MA 2001)
 Gossett v. State of Oklahoma, 245 F.3d 1172 (10th Cir. 2001)
 Gott v. Berea College, 161 SW 204 (KY 1913)
 Gratz v. Bollinger, 539 US 244 (2003)
 Griswald v. Connecticut, 381 US 479 (1965)
 Gross v. Lopez, 419 US 565 (SUPREME 1975)
 Grove v. Ohio State University, 424 S. Supp. 377 (D. OH 1976)
 Hall vs. Medical College of Ohio, 742 F. 2d 299 (6th Cir. 1984)
 Harris v. Forklift Systems Inc., 510 US 17 (1993)
 Harwood v. Johns Hopkins, 747 A. 2d 205 (MD Spec. App. 2000)
 Healey v. James, 408 US 169 (1972)
 Healy v. Larsson, 323 NYS 2d 625 (NY Sup. 1971)
 Henson v. Honor Committee of the University of Virginia, 719 F. 2d 69 (4th Cir. 1983)
 Hickey v. Zezulka, 487 NW 2d 106 (MI Sup. 1992)
 Hill v. NCAA, 273 Cal. Rptr. 402 (CA App. Div. 1990)
 Hill v. NCAA, 865 P. 2d 633, 7 (CA Sup. 1994)
 Hogan v. Mississippi State School for Women, 458 US 718 (1982)
 Hopwood v. Texas, 78 F. 3d 932 (5th Cir. 1996)
 Jenkins v. Louisiana State Board of Education, 506 F. 2d 992 (5th Cir. 1975)
 Johnson v. Schmitz, 119 F. Supp. 2d 90 (D CO 2000)
 Joyner v. Whiting, 477 F. 2d 456 (4th Cir. 1973)
 Klein v. Smith, 635 F. Supp. 1140 (D MA 1986)
 Knoll v. Board of Regents of the University of Nebraska, 601 NW 2d 757 (NB Sup. 1999)
 Laura O. v. State, 610 NYS 2d 826 (NY App. Div. 1994)
 Lesser v. Board of Education of New York, 1963 239 NYS 2d 776 (NY App. Div. 1963)
 Levin v. Yeshiva University, 709 NYS 2d 392 (NY App. Div. 2000)
 Long v. University of North Carolina at Wilmington, 461 SE 2d 773 (NC App. Div. 1995)
 Lovelace v. Southeastern Mass, 793 F. 2d 419 (1st Cir. 1986)
 Loving v. Boren, 956 F. Supp. 953 (WD OK 1997)
 Mahavongsanan v. Hall, 529 F. 2d 448 (5th Cir. 1976)
 Mainstream Loudoun v. Bd of Trustees of Loudoun County Library, 2 F. Supp. 783 (ED VA 1998)
 Mangala v. Brown University, 135 F. 3d 80 (1st Cir. 1998)
 Matthews v. Elderidge, 424 US 319 (1976)
 McDonald v. Hogness, 598 P. 2d 707 (WA Sup. 1979)
 McDonald v. Santa Fe Trail Transportation Co., 427 US 273 (1976)
 Miller v. State, 478 NYS 2d 829 (NY Supp. 1984)
 Mississippi Medical Center v. Hughes, 765 So. 2d 528 (MI Supp. 2000)
 Moore v. Student Affairs Committee of Troy State University, 284 F. Supp. (MD AB 1968)
 Morale v. Grigel, 422 F. Supp. 988 (D. NH 1976)
 Morse v. Regents of the University of Colorado, 154 F. 3d 1124 (10th Cir. 1998)
 Mullins v. Pine Manor College, 449 NE 2d 331 (Mass. Supp. 1983)
 Gay Students Organization of New Hampshire v. Bonner, 509 F. 2d 652 (1st Cir. 1974)
 New York v. Ferber, 458 US 747 (1982)
 NCAA v. Tarkanian, 488 US 179 (1988)
 Nogueras v. University of Puerto Rico, 890 US 179 (D. PR 1995)
 Nyquist v. Jean-Marie Mauclet, 432 US 1 (1977)
 O'Halloran v. University of Washington, 856 F. 2d 1375 (9th Cir. 1988)
 Online Policy Group v. Diebold, Inc. 337 F. Supp. 2d 1195 (D. ND 2004)
 Orin v. Barclay, 272 F. 3d. 1207 (9th Cir. 2001)
 Papish v. Board of Curators of the University of Missouri, 410 US 667 (1973)
 Parate v. Isibor, 868 F. 2d 821 (6th Cir. 1989)
 Perry Ed. Assoc. v. Perry Local Ed. Assoc., 460 US 37 (1983)
 Piazzola v. Watkins, 442 F. 2d 284 (5th Cir. 1971)
 PPAU of Col. & Willamette v. Am. Coalition of Life Advocates, 290 F. 3d 1058 (9th Cir. 2002)
 Plyler v. Doe, 457 US 202 (1982)
 Podberesky v. Kirwan, 38 F. 3d 147 (4th Cir. 1994)
 Police Department v. Mosley, 408 US 92 (1972)
 Prostrollo v. University of South Dakota, 507 F. 2d 775 (8th Cir. 1974)
 Pushkin v. Regents of the University of Colorado, 658 F. 2d 1372 (10th Cir. 1981)
 Reno v. American Civil Liberties Union, 521 US 844 (1997)
 Riggin v. Bd. of Trustees of Ball St. Univ., 489 NE 2d 616 (D. IN 1986)
 Roberts v. Haragan, 346 F. Supp. 2d 853 (D. TX 2004)
 Rosenberger v. Rector and Visitors of the University of Virginia, 515 US 819 (1995)
 Rosenthal v. Webster University, 230 F.3d 1363 (8th Cir. 2000)
 Ross v. Creighton University, 957 F. 2d 410 (7th Cir. 1992)
 Salvador v. Bennett, 800 F. 2d 97 (7th Cir. 1986)
 Schaer v. Braneis, U. 735 NE 2d 373 (Mass. Sup. 2000)
 Sharick v. Southeastern University of the Health Sciences, 780 So. 2d 136 (D. FL 2000)
 Sharif by Salahuddin v. New York State Education Department, 709 F. Supp. 345 (D. SD 1989)
 Shelton v. Turner, 364 U.S. 479, 487 (1960)
 Shin v. MIT, LEXIS 333, at 22 (Mass. Sup. 2005)
 Smyth v. Lubbers, 398 F. Supp. 777 (WD MI 1975)
 Southeastern Community College v. Davis, 442 US 397 (1979)
 Speakes v. Grantham, 317 F. Supp. 1253 (SD MI 1970)
 Spartacus Youth League v. Bd. of Trustees of IL Industrial Univ., 502 F. Supp. 789 (ND IL 1980)
 Stanley v. McGrath, 719 F. 2d 279 (8th Cir. 1983)
 State v. Hunter, 831 P. 2d 1033 (UT App. Div. 1992)
 State of North Carolina v. Pendleton, 451 SE 2d 274 (NC Supp. 1994)
 State of Washington v. Chrisman, 455 US 1 (1982)
 Sweezy v. New Hampshire, 345 US 234 (1957)
 Tedeschi v. Wagner College, 402 NYS 2d 967 (NY Sup. 1978)
 Texas v. Johnson, 491 US 397 (1989)
 Tinker vs. Des Moines Independent Community School District, 393 US 503 (1969)
 Texas Lightsey v. King, 567 F. Supp. 645 (ED NY1983)
 Tully v. Orr, 608 F. Supp. 1222 (ED NY 1985)
 United States v. Fordice, 505 US 717 (1992)
 United States v. Commonwealth of Virginia, 976 F. 2d 890 (4th Cir. 1992)
 United States v. League of United Latin American Citizens, 793 F. 2d 636 (5th Cir. 1986)
 University of Texas v. Camenisch, 451 US 390 (1981)
 United States v. Orozco-Santillan, 903 F. 2d 1262 (9th Cir. 1990)
 Vangeli v. Schneider, 598 NYS 2d 837 (NY App. Div. 1993)
 Van Stry v. State, 479 NYS 2d 258 (NY App. Div. 1984)
 Widmar v. Vincent, 454 US 263 (1981)
 Williams v. Saxbe, 413 F. Supp. 654 (D. DC 1976)
 White v. Davis, 533 P. 2d 222 (CA Supp. 1975)
 Woods v. The Wright Institute, 141 F. 3d 1183 (9th Cir. 1998)
 Woodis v. Westark Community College, 160 F. 3d 435 (8th Cir. 1998)
 Wright v. Schreffler, 618 A. 2d 412 (PA Sup. 1992)
 Wright v. Texas Southern University, 392 F. 2d 728 (5th Cir. 1968)
 Wynne v. Tufts University School of Medicine, 976 F. 2d 791 (1st Cir. 1992)

External links
 navigatehighered.com: Student rights info., advocacy and student union resources
 Model Student Classroom Bill of Rights
 National Youth Rights Association
 Foundation for Individual Rights in Education

 
 
Higher education law